Bytsenkov is a rural locality (a settlement) in Krasnoyaruzhsky District, Belgorod Oblast, Russia. The population was 267 as of 2010. There are 6 streets.

Geography 
Bytsenkov is located 10 km north of Krasnaya Yaruga (the district's administrative centre) by road. Sergiyevka is the nearest rural locality.

References 

Rural localities in Krasnoyaruzhsky District